Swensen may refer to:

Swensen's, global chain of ice cream restaurants
Cole Swensen (born 1955), American poet
David F. Swensen (1956–2021), American businessman, Chief Investment Officer at Yale University
Glen W. Swensen (1910-2000), American lawyer, judge, and politiciam
Jenny Swensen, fictional paranormal in the Marvel Comics imprint New Universe